WQNZ (95.1 FM) is a radio station airing a country music format licensed to Natchez, Mississippi.  The station is owned by Listen Up Yall Media .

95 Country is the only 100.000 Watt station in the region and it reaches 35 counties and parishes in Southwest Mississippi and East Central Louisiana. By designation of the FCC, 95 Country is the regions primary news, weather and emergency source.

Its transmitter is located on 26 Colonel John Pitchford Parkway on the WNTZ-TV tower. WQNZ 95.1 and WKSO 97.3 also use the tower to broadcast their signal.

References

External links

Country radio stations in the United States
QNZ